Kampmann's  second cabinet was the government of Denmark from 18 November 1960 to 3 September 1962, headed by Viggo Kampmann as prime minister. It was a minority government consisting of the Social Democrats and the Danish Social Liberal Party. It was formed following the 1960 election, continuing from the previous government, but without the Justice Party, who had lost all of their seats in the election. The cabinet was dissolved following Kampmann's resignation due to health reasons on 3 September 1962.

Composition

|}

References 

 Cabinets of Denmark
 1960 establishments in Denmark
 Cabinets established in 1960
 Cabinets disestablished in 1962
 1962 disestablishments